Tavoleto is a comune (municipality) with some 868 inhabitants in the Province of Pesaro e Urbino in the Italian region Marche, located about  northwest of Ancona and about  southwest of Pesaro.

Tavoleto borders the following municipalities: Mercatino Conca, Mondaino, Monte Cerignone, Montefiore Conca, Saludecio, Sassocorvaro Auditore, Urbino.

References

Cities and towns in the Marche